Cyrille Beaudry (April 16, 1835 – May 3, 1904) was a Roman Catholic priest and educator in Canada.

Beaudry was born and educated in Lower Canada. He worked for most of his career as an educator and administrator within Collège Joliette in Joliette, Quebec. He was a member of the Clerics of Saint Viator. 

In addition, he wrote several religious works and numerous pamphlets and articles, which are a valuable resource to present day religious scholars.

References 
 

19th-century Canadian Roman Catholic priests
1835 births
1904 deaths